Kiwiburn is a regional Burning Man event celebrating principles such as inclusion, radical self-expression, gifting, participative art and culture.

History
In 1994, Mark ‘Yonderman’ Stirling and his partner Jane discovered Burning Man by accident while on a camping trip in the Black Rock Desert, Nevada. Mark decided to stage the first regional burn in New Zealand in late 2003 as part of the South Island's Visionz festival. It was met with great enthusiasm from the participants, so the 2005 and 2006 burns took place as stand-alone events, attracting around 200 people (Mark co-ran these events with Grant ‘Tribalman’ Knowles, a friend and local drum-maker/festival organizer).

2007 marked the first year the festival was held in the North Island. In mid-2006, amidst the planning for the 2007 event, a group of highly enthused, motivated burners joined with Yonderman to form an organizational structure and bring the event north. The event was aptly named Megamorphosis, which means Massive Change. Kiwiburn has helped create a large community of burners around New Zealand, and the annual event, along with the occasional localized gatherings, continue to maintain its unique culture.

Kiwiburn celebrated its 10-year anniversary in 2013 with the theme enlighTENment! 

After seven burns in Whakamaru Doman, Mangakino, Kiwiburn moved to a private farm in Hunterville in 2014. It was a huge undertaking to find a new site, close to a town and away from roads, where the locals immediately embraced the festival's culture.

The event is now held annually at the end of January.

Past events

Kiwiburn did not run in 2019 due to difficulty obtaining resource consent.

Themes
Each year's event is centered around an Art Theme, selected from community submissions.

Culture

As a Regional Burning Man Event, Kiwiburn adheres to the ten principles of Burning Man.  Among these are the Leave No Trace philosophy, radical self-expression, radical self-reliance, and communal effort.

Theme Camps are one of the key components of vibrant regional Burning Man events.  Theme Camps are established by participants to enhance the experience for all participants. Theme Camps often put on events during Kiwiburn so that participants get to know each other and encourage each other to get more involved .

Notable, recurrent theme camps include "The Hangout", "Where did all our couches go?", "funkhutt", "The Flojo", "Pillowtopia", "DanceAlot", "Chur", "Taradise", "Swing Fling", and "Camp F*ck Yeah".

The theme for 2022 will be Time Travel.

See also
 List of regional Burning Man events

References

External links
 

Burning Man
Clothing-optional events
Counterculture festivals
Cultural festivals in New Zealand
Naturism in New Zealand